Aquia Creek is a  tributary of the tidal segment of the Potomac River and is located in northern Virginia.

The White House was built largely using sandstone quarried from Aquia Creek from 1792 to 1799.

History
The Public Quarry at Government Island in the creek served as the source for Aquia Creek sandstone. This sandstone was used in numerous public buildings; the National Capitol Columns were quarried in the early 1800s, and transported to Washington on a barge. The White House, which began its construction in 1799, was built largely from sandstone material that was quarried from the banks of Aquia Creek from the previous seven years (1792-1799).

In an early American Civil War skirmish, the Battle of Aquia Creek, three US gunships fired on a battery garrison during the Union campaign to blockade Chesapeake Bay (May–June 1861). There were an estimated 10 casualties.

See also
List of rivers of Virginia

References

Rivers of Fauquier County, Virginia
Rivers of Virginia
Rivers of Stafford County, Virginia
Tributaries of the Potomac River